St. Helens North is a constituency created in 1983 represented in the House of Commons of the UK Parliament since 2015 by the Labour Party's Conor McGinn, Shadow Minister without Portfolio from 4 December 2021. Between 1997 and 2015 the MP was Labour's David Watts.

Boundaries

1983–2010: The Metropolitan Borough of St Helens wards of Billinge and Seneley Green, Blackbrook, Broad Oak, Haydock, Moss Bank, Newton East, Newton West, Rainford, and Windle.

2010–present: As above, less Broad Oak, plus Earlestown; Newton replaced Newton East and West wards.

The constituency is one of two covering the Metropolitan Borough, the other being St Helens South and Whiston.  It includes the north of the town of St Helens, and Billinge, Seneley Green,  Earlestown, Blackbrook, Haydock, Newton-le-Willows and Rainford.

History
Results of the winning party
The 2015 result made the seat the 42nd-safest of Labour's 232 seats by percentage of majority.  The constituency was created in 1983, primarily replacing parts of the St Helens and Newton constituencies.  It has been won to date by candidates fielded by the Labour Party — by the former Newton MP John Evans and from 1997 by David Watts, a former council leader. As to the predominantly-contributing two seats to the present division, St Helens has been won by the party since 1935 and so too Newton.  The party's two successive candidates for MP have won an absolute majority (plurality) of the votes since 1987 (inclusive).

Opposition parties
The Conservative Party fielded the runner-up candidate in 2010 and 2015.  Neither the Liberal Democrats nor the Green candidate won 5% of the vote in 2015 to retain their deposits. The third place in 2015 was taken by the UKIP candidate, Smith, who narrowly gained more than the national average swing through a swing of 10.4%.

Turnout
Turnout has ranged from 77.4% in 1992 to 52.7% in 2001.

Constituency profile
The seat includes the large town of St Helens, noted by visitors for its successful rugby league side and the nearby horseracing racecourse at Haydock Park.  Despite these prominent sports venues, workless claimants, registered jobseekers, were in November 2012 higher than the national average of 3.8%, at 4.7% of the population based on a statistical compilation by The Guardian, which was close to the Greater Manchester and Merseyside average but higher than the regional average of 4.4%. With the exception of the Conservative area of Rainford, virtually every other ward in the seat is safely Labour.

Members of Parliament

Elections

Elections in the 2010s

Elections in the 2000s

Elections in the 1990s

Elections in the 1980s

See also
List of parliamentary constituencies in Merseyside

Notes

References

Parliamentary constituencies in North West England
Constituencies of the Parliament of the United Kingdom established in 1983
Politics of the Metropolitan Borough of St Helens